Bormujos is a city located in the province of Seville, Spain. According to the 2007 census (INE), the city has a population of 15,741 inhabitants.

References

External links
Bormujos - Sistema de Información Multiterritorial de Andalucía

Municipalities of the Province of Seville